"I Wanna Be Your Man" is a Lennon–McCartney-penned song first recorded and released as a single by the Rolling Stones, and then recorded by the Beatles for their second studio album With the Beatles. The song was primarily written by Paul McCartney, and finished by Lennon and McCartney in the corner of a Richmond club while Mick Jagger and Keith Richards were talking.

The Rolling Stones version
Released as their second single on 1 November 1963, the Stones' version was the group's first UK top-20 hit, peaking at number 12 on the British chart. Their rendition features Brian Jones' distinctive slide guitar and Bill Wyman's driving bass playing. It is one of the few Rolling Stones songs to feature only Brian Jones on backing vocals. In the US, the song was initially released as London 45-LON 9641 (with "Stoned" on the B side) without any success and was soon after re-released on 6 March 1964 as the B-side to "Not Fade Away".

According to various accounts, either the Rolling Stones' manager/producer Andrew Loog Oldham or the Rolling Stones themselves ran into Lennon and McCartney on the street as the two were returning from an awards luncheon. Hearing that the band were in need of material for a single, Lennon and McCartney went to their session at De Lane Lea Studio and finished off the song – whose verse they had already been working on – in the corner of the room while the impressed Rolling Stones watched.

Mick Jagger recalled the song in 1968:

McCartney stated in 2016:

 
Bill Wyman noted how the Rolling Stones adapted the song to their style:

Released only as a single, the Rolling Stones' rendition did not appear on a studio album. The song was reissued in the UK on the Decca compilation albums Milestones (1972) and Rolled Gold: The Very Best of the Rolling Stones (1975). In 1989, it was issued on the US compilation album Singles Collection: The London Years. It is included on the four CD version of the 2012 GRRR! compilation.

The B-side of the second single was "Stoned", a "Green Onions"–influenced instrumental composed by Nanker/Phelge, the early collective pseudonym for the group. Additionally, it included the 'Sixth Stone' pianist Ian Stewart, making it the first released self-penned composition, with added spoken asides by Mick Jagger. Some original 1963 copies were issued with the misprinted title as "Stones", making it doubly collectable as a rarity.

On 1 January 1964, the Stones' "I Wanna Be Your Man" was the first song ever performed on the BBC's Top of the Pops. The segment was featured in the 1995 docu-series The Beatles Anthology. A performance of the song on The Arthur Haynes Show recorded on 7 February 1964 appears as part of the bonus material on the 2012 documentary film Crossfire Hurricane.

The Beatles version

The Beatles' version was sung by Ringo Starr and appeared on the group's second UK album, With the Beatles, released 22 November 1963 and on the US release Meet the Beatles!, released on 20 January 1964. It was driven by a heavily tremoloed, open E-chord on a guitar played through a Vox AC30 amplifier. John Lennon was dismissive of the song in 1980, saying:

The Beatles also recorded two versions of the song for the BBC. One version was for the Saturday Club, recorded on 7 January 1964 and first broadcast on 15 February. The second version was for the From Us to You show recorded on 28 February and broadcast on 30 March; this was released decades later on the Live at the BBC collection. The Beatles also recorded a version for the Around The Beatles TV show, recorded on 19 April 1964; this version was released on the Anthology 1 collection in 1995.

Live versions

Ringo Starr and the All-Starr Band version
Ringo Starr & His All-Starr Band have performed the song as a concert staple during their 1989 through 2012–2013 All-Starr Band concerts. The song was on the setlist for the first line-up in 1989. The 1992 line-up did not perform the song. Every All-Starr Band line-up from 1995 to 2012–2013 has included the song on their setlist. The song has appeared on the following compilation albums: Ringo Starr and His Third All-Starr Band Volume 1, King Biscuit Flower Hour Presents Ringo & His New All-Starr Band, The Anthology... So Far, Ringo Starr and Friends, Ringo Starr: Live at Soundstage, Ringo Starr & His All Starr Band Live 2006, and Live at the Greek Theatre 2008.

Paul McCartney version
McCartney performed the song occasionally, notably on the soundcheck of his 1993 live album Paul Is Live.

McCartney performed the song in his 2022 Glastonbury Festival set with special guest Bruce Springsteen.

X-Pensive Winos version
Keith Richards performed the song live with his group the X-Pensive Winos during their 1988 Talk is Cheap tour of the US. They performed the song at the Orpheum Theatre in Boston, at the Universal Amphitheater in Los Angeles, the Brendan Byrne Arena in East Rutherford, New Jersey, and at the Hollywood Palladium.

Other recordings
The song was parodied in 1964 by the Barron Knights on their hit single "Call Up the Groups (Medley)" (Columbia DB.7317) in which they imitated the Rolling Stones' version. It was also recorded by Adam Faith in 1965, Count Basie and his Orchestra in 1966, the Day Brothers, Terry Manning in 1970, Suzi Quatro in 1973, The Rezillos in 1977, Roger Webb and his Trio, the Sparrows, the Merseyboys, Bob Leaper, the Flamin' Groovies in 1993, Sam Phillips in 2003, Audience (band) in 2005, Les Baronets in French as "Oh! Je Veux Être À Toi", the Rockin' Ramrods, the Smithereens in 2007, and the Stooges on their 2007 album The Weirdness featuring Iggy Pop.

Homages
Bob Dylan recorded a song for Blonde on Blonde (1966) called "I Wanna Be Your Lover" as a "tip of the hat" to the Lennon/McCartney song. It was left off the final album, but was eventually released on the compilation boxed set Biograph (1985).I Wanna Be Your Lover shares the lyric:

I wanna be your lover, baby, I wanna be your man.

This refrain is also used in the 1977 The Saints song Erotic Neurotic.

The song contains a heavy Bo Diddley beat. This was acknowledged by Bo Diddley himself in the song "London Stomp" (album "Hey Good Lookin'"). He sings "Hey, Liverpool, we got the London Stomp" over an "I Wanna Be Your Man" background.

Personnel

Rolling Stones version

According to authors Andy Babiuk and Greg Prevost:

Mick Jagger lead vocal
Brian Jones backing vocals, lead slide guitar
Keith Richards rhythm guitar
Bill Wyman bass
Charlie Watts drums

Beatles version
According to author Ian MacDonald:

The Beatles
Ringo Starr double-tracked vocal, drums, maracas
John Lennon backing vocal, rhythm guitar
Paul McCartney backing vocal, bass
George Harrison lead guitar
Uncredited (played by the Beatles) tambourine

Additional musician
George Martin Hammond organ

Notes

References

 
 
 
 
 
 
 
 

1963 singles
1963 songs
Decca Records singles
London Records singles
Song recordings produced by George Martin
Song recordings produced by Jimmy Miller
Songs published by Northern Songs
Songs written by Lennon–McCartney
The Beatles songs
The Rolling Stones songs